Herrenvolk, meaning "master people", is a concept in Nazi ideology. It may also refer to:

 Herrenvolk democracy, a term describing a system of ethnocracy that offers democratic participation to the dominant group only
 "Herrenvolk" (The X-Files), an episode of the TV series

See also
 Master Race (disambiguation)